Ukrainian presidential elections determine who will serve as the President of Ukraine for the next five years.

Since the establishment of the position of the President of Ukraine in 1991, the presidential elections have taken place seven times: in 1991, 1994, 1999, 2004, 2010, 2014 and 2019.

Procedure 
The presidential election rules are defined by the Ukrainian Constitution and the Ukrainian law "On the Elections of the President of Ukraine" from 25 March 1999 (as amended on 18 March 2014).

Eligibility requirements 
A candidate for the President's office must:
 be a citizen of Ukraine;
 be at least 35 years of age on the election day;
 have the right to vote;
 speak the official language (Ukrainian);
 be living in Ukraine for the last ten years.

The same person cannot be elected President more than twice in a row.

Nominating process 
A candidate can be nominated by a political party or be self-nominated.

Campaigning 
A presidential candidate may start his or her election campaign the next day after he or she is registered by the Central Election Commission.

The presidential election campaign ends at 24:00 of the last Friday before the election day.

Popular vote 
Regular presidential elections are held on the last Sunday of March (formerly in October) of the fifth (and last) year of the incumbent President's term of office. If a president's term in office ends prematurely, the election of a new president must take place within ninety days of the previous president leaving office.

The president is elected by direct popular vote in a two-round majoritarian contest: if no candidate receives a simple majority (over 50%) of the votes in the first round, the two candidates with the most votes advance to a run-off. The second (run-off) round is held within two weeks after the first. If one of the two remaining candidates drops out of the race less than 12 days before the second round, the other must still win over 50% of the second-round vote to be elected president.

The voter must be a Ukrainian citizen and be at least 18 years old on the election day.

There are no requirements for a certain minimum voter turnout.

List of Ukrainian presidential elections 
 1991 Ukrainian presidential election
 1994 Ukrainian presidential election
 1999 Ukrainian presidential election
 2004 Ukrainian presidential election
 2010 Ukrainian presidential election
 2014 Ukrainian presidential election
 2019 Ukrainian presidential election
 2024 Ukrainian presidential election

Voter turnout 
The highest voter turnout–84 percent–was recorded during the first election in December 1991.

See also 
 Elections in Ukraine

References